Aldenham is a village and civil parish in Hertfordshire,  north-east of Watford and  southwest of Radlett. It was mentioned in the Domesday Book and is one of Hertsmere's 14 conservation areas. The village has eight pre-19th-century listed buildings and the parish itself is largely unchanged, though buildings have been rebuilt, since Saxon times when the majority of the land was owned by the abbots of Westminster Abbey.

In the Index of Multiple Deprivation, the ward of Aldenham East was ranked the least deprived ward out of 8414 in England, while Aldenham West also featured among the least deprived three per cent in the country.  Radlett forms the eastern part of the civil parish.

History 
For most of recorded history Aldenham was administered together with the nearby settlement of Radlett (or at least, the western part of that village), which until the modern era was of comparable size.

In 1086 in the Domesday Book, Aldenham parish appears to have straddled the boundary of two ancient hundreds: Danish Hundred (East of North Watford, North of Patchetts Green) and St Albans Hundred (South of Hanstead). The Domesday surveyors were recording a property ownership dispute that had been ongoing for three centuries regarding heavily forested land.

The Church of St John the Baptist in Aldenham village is seven hundred and fifty years old and there is good reason to believe that an earlier Saxon church stood on the site.
After the Reformation the lands were sold off to the highest bidders and Aldenham is probably smaller today than it was 500 years ago.

In 1940, a German air attack damaged stained glass and removed the "Hertfordshire Spike" – the spire on the top of the tower. Restoration work was completed in 1951.

Both the church and the village have been used in many films, advertisements and television programmes, being within easy travelling distance of Elstree Studios. These have included the film Confessions of a Window Cleaner, BBC television series Pathfinders, and the Coldplay music video for "Life in Technicolor II", to name but a few.

Although it gave its name to the Aldenham Bus Works owned by London Transport, Aldenham Works was actually located at nearby Elstree.

Hamlets

Round Bush
Its population size and number of buildings make it a smaller settlement. However, Round Bush has one pub A more average (smaller) size hamlet, the centre with the vast majority of the homes due to surrounding cultivated larger sized farms – is where three roads meet at a public house.

Letchmore Heath

Patchetts Green
On Hilfield Lane, Patchetts Green is a hamlet of several historic houses, including the Three Compasses public house, Little Patchetts Green Farm and Patchetts Farm.

The other listed buildings here are: Delrow Cottage, Delrow Almshouses and Garden Cottage

Crossways Cottage is just northeast of the Infant School and almshouses and is opposite the junction of the lane leading to Letchmore Heath.

Other landmarks 
Close to the church stand a number of buildings of historical interest. The earliest of these is Aldenham Social Club – a late medieval hall house dating from around 1500. To the west of the churchyard stands Church Farm House (16th – 18th century) and to the east the old vicarage (now two dwellings), a fine example of early 18th century red brick architecture.

The parish of Aldenham also has three public schools: Aldenham School, Haberdashers' Boys' School and Haberdashers' Girls' School.

Wall Hall is a magnificent gothic revival mansion with a castellated façade created in the early nineteenth century.

Sporting and leisure amenities

The golf and country park is central to the village in Church Lane. Aldenham Country Park is council-owned land, which is some distance away from the old village, closer to the two southern hamlets; it has a  lake, Hillfield Reservoir, and is south of Letchmore Heath.

Directly south of the country park is Aldenham Sailing Club which uses Aldenham Reservoir, a  lake next to Elstree.

Aldenham Cricket Club (ACC) was founded in 1972. Aldenham has been playing cricket for over 40 years in the Parish. Hosted by the Aldenham Social Club, Aldenham Cricket Club has won the Watford Observer Plate on two occasions, the Hertfordshire Village Trophy, and won the league in the last two years.

Notable people
Richard Platt (died 1600), brewer, founder of Aldenham School
Sir Adolphus Dalrymple (1784–1866) lived at Delrow House, Aldenham.

References

External links

Aldenham (A Guide to Old Hertfordshire)

 
Villages in Hertfordshire
Hertsmere
Civil parishes in Hertfordshire